"One Last Kiss" is a song by the American rock band The J. Geils Band. This is the band's first single to be labeled by EMI America.

Background
The song's architecture is a slight departure from the band's stock in trade of 120 bpm or less and prominent piano and organ in the mix.
Cash Box said that it "opens with majestic guitar work."

Chart performance

Weekly charts

References

Songs about kissing
The J. Geils Band songs
1978 singles
1978 songs
EMI America Records singles
Song recordings produced by Seth Justman
Songs written by Seth Justman
Songs written by Peter Wolf